Roxanne Constantin is a Canadian musician who is formerly the member of the bands Quo Vadis, Negativa and Rostrum. She has a B.A. in piano performance from the Montreal Conservatory of Music.

Biography
In December 2007, Roxanne Constantin was added to Negativa as a vocalist. She left Negativa's line-up afterwards.

Roxanne Constantin had been a supporter and assistant of Quo Vadis since 2002 (for instance donating keyboards and vocals previously), but became an official member of the band in 2008. She joined the band as a bassist, along with drummer Patrice Hamlin and vocalist Trevor Birnie.

Discography

As a guest musician
Quo Vadis – Defiant Imagination (full-length, 2004)
Aven Aura – The Shadow of Idols (full-length, 2005)
The Plasmarifle – While You Were Sleeing the World Changed in an Instant (full-length, 2008)
Necronomicon – The Return of the Witch (full-length, 2010)

References

Living people
Canadian heavy metal bass guitarists
Canadian keyboardists
Canadian women heavy metal singers
21st-century Canadian multi-instrumentalists
Heavy metal keyboardists
Death metal musicians
Conservatoire de musique du Québec à Montréal alumni
Women bass guitarists
Year of birth missing (living people)
Place of birth missing (living people)
21st-century Canadian women musicians
Women in metal